The 59th Motorized Brigade is a formation of the Ukrainian Ground Forces. The brigade was activated on 8 December 2014 in the city of Haisyn in Vinnytsia Oblast and took command of three volunteer territorial defence battalions. On 24 August 2015, Ukraine's Independence Day, the brigade received its flag and became fully operational. The brigade fought in the War in Donbas and will become a mechanized formation in the future.

History 
On 8 December 2016, the commander of Operational Command South named 59th brigade the best Ukrainian motorized brigade according to 2015 summary.

On 20 January 2018, the brigade's units returned to garrison in Haisyn from frontlines. They were deployed in the combat zone in Donbas in the Priazovia region since May 2017.

Between 24 February – 2 March 2022, the brigade fought in the Battle of Kherson, during the 2022 Russian invasion of Ukraine.  This brigade continues to fight Russian units in Kherson Province into April 2022.

Since August 2022, the brigade has been on consistent rotation fighting in the Battle of Bakhmut.

Structure 
As of 2017 the brigade's structure is as follows:

 59th Motorized Brigade, Haisyn
 Headquarters & Headquarters Company
 9th Motorized Infantry Battalion "Vinnytsia"
 10th Motorized Infantry Battalion "Polissya"
 11th Motorized Infantry Battalion "Kyivan Rus"
 Brigade Artillery Group
 Headquarters & Target Acquisition Battery
 Howitzer Artillery Battalion (D-20)
 Anti-tank Artillery Battalion (MT-12 Rapira)
 Anti-Aircraft Missile Artillery Battalion
 Reconnaissance Company
 Tank Company
 Engineer Company
 Maintenance Company
 Logistic Company
 Signal Company
 Medical Company
 Sniper Platoon

References

Motorized brigades of Ukraine
Military units and formations established in 2014
Military units and formations of Ukraine in the war in Donbas
Military units and formations of the 2022 Russian invasion of Ukraine